The Tromp class were two frigates built for the Royal Netherlands Navy during the 1970s to replace the s as squadron flagships.

The Tromp-class frigates entered service in 1975 and 1976 and served until 1999 and 2001. Both ships were built by Royal Schelde Shipyard in Flushing (Vlissingen). The ships served as fleet flagships and area air defence vessels. Their 3D radar under a large polyester radome, gave the ships the nickname "Kojak" in the Netherlands Navy. Originally the ships were to have the British Sea Dart missile system, but this was changed to the more compact American Standard surface-to-air missile.

The ships were replaced by the s.

Ships

See also
 
 Maarten Tromp

References

Bibliography
 
 

 
Frigate classes
Frigates of the Royal Netherlands Navy